Lieutenant Colonel Ramakrishnan Vishwanathan, VrC was the second-in-command of 18 Grenadiers which was conducting operations on and around Tololing mountain, Drass sector, Kargil, during Operation Vijay. He was posthumously awarded the Vir Chakra for his actions during the Kargil War. A Tripunithura a street near Eroor Pisharikovil Temple is named in his honour.

Early life
Vishwanathan was born to V Ramakrishna Iyer and Kamala, in 1960. He was raised in Kochi and attended Kendriya Vidyalaya at Gandhi Nagar in Kadavanthra.

Military life 
Vishwanathan was commissioned into the Indian Army on June 1981 after completing his military training from National Defence Academy in 1980. He had served with the Indian Peacekeeping Force in Sri Lanka and later with the UN Peacekeeping Force in Angola.

The then Colonel Khushal Thakur, commanding-officer of the 18 grenadiers, recalled Vishwanathan's courage with the narrative, "The 18 Grenadiers had launched three unsuccessful attacks on Tololing. On June 2, Lt. Col. R Vishwanathan volunteered to go."

Vir Chakra Citation
The citation for  the Vir Chakra reads as follows

References

External links
http://ikashmir.net/kargilheroes/vishwanathan.html
http://www.bharat-rakshak.com/ARMY/Galleries/Wars/Kargil/0366.jpg.html

1960 births
1999 deaths
Kargil War